Volatile elements may refer to:
 Volatility (chemistry), a property of elements in physical chemistry
 Volatiles, a classification of elements in cosmochemistry and planetary science